Yang Fenglan (born 1949) is a Chinese businesswoman who has been convicted of smuggling ivory. She was formerly based in Tanzania and is nicknamed by the media as the "Ivory Queen".

Biography
Yang was born in Beijing, China in 1949. She graduated from the Beijing Foreign Studies University, where she majored in Swahili. In 1975, she was assigned to Tanzania, where she worked as a translator in the construction of the TAZARA Railway, linking Zambia's landlocked copper belt with Tanzania's coast, at the time China's most significant African investment. After the project, she returned to China.

In 1998, she returned to Tanzania and set up two businesses in Dar es Salaam: Beijing Restaurant and Beijing Great Wall Investment. The restaurant has been successful. She also served as vice-chairwoman and secretary-general of the China-Africa Business Council of Tanzania.

Yang started smuggling ivory in 2006. Most of the elephant tusks were smuggled and sold to Asia.

Yang was arrested in October 2015. In February 2019, she and two Tanzanian men, Salivius Matembo and Manase Philemon, were each sentenced to 15 years' imprisonment for "leading an organised criminal gang" by the Tanzanian court. Her properties were ordered to be confiscated. She has appealed her sentence. In reaction to her conviction, the Chinese Foreign Ministry issued a public statement supporting the court decision and condemning illegal activities of Chinese nationals abroad.

Personal life 
Yang has a daughter named Fei, which is short for "Feizhou", the Chinese word for Africa.

References

1949 births
Living people
Beijing Foreign Studies University alumni
Businesspeople from Beijing
Chinese expatriates in Tanzania
Chinese restaurateurs
Chinese smugglers
People's Republic of China translators
Chinese women in business
Restaurant founders
Wildlife smuggling
Women restaurateurs